Renfrow may refer to:

 Renfrow, Oklahoma, U.S. town
 Renfrow (surname)

See also
Renfro (disambiguation)